Neunzehnerrufen (German: "Call the Nineteen") is an Austrian card game of the Tarock (tarot) family for four players. Under the name Taroky or Czech Taroky it is the national Tarock variant of the Czech Republic and Slovakia, but - with certain variations – is also played in parts of the Austrian states of Upper Austria, Lower Austria and the Styria as well as in Poland south of the River Vistula.

Despite its name, the game is less related to Zwanzigerrufen than to Königrufen. However, it differs from the latter in the number and way the packets are dealt: 12 cards to each of the four players, 2 × 3 cards go, as a talon into the middle of the table. Thus there has been and is a cross-fertilization process between the two variants, with the exchange of game and bonus declarations.

Major differences from Königrufen 
 As the name suggests, a playing partner during a contract of Rufer (Ruferspiel) may not specify a King, but the Tarock XIX.
 In contracts in which the aim is to win the majority of card points, there are stages: the more card points in the tricks, the more game points are scored by the winning side.
 Bonuses from the hand that reveal information about one's own hand and are hardly ever played in Königrufen are mandatory calls in Neunzehnerrufen. The player gets points for doing so, but to forget is seen as revoking.

References

Literature

External links 
Taroky at www.pagat.com

Tarock card games
Four-player card games

cs:Taroky